Hattingen (Ruhr) Mitte is a railway station situated in Hattingen in western Germany. It is a terminus station for the S3 line of Rhine-Ruhr S-Bahn and is classified by Deutsche Bahn as a category 6 station.

The station was opened by Deutsche Bundesbahn on 3 July 1987.

It is served by Rhine-Ruhr S-Bahn line S 3 every 30 minutes, tram route 308 (every 10 minutes) and 11 bus routes: CE31 (every 20 minutes), SB37 (every 60 minutes), SB38 (every 60 minutes), 141 (every 30 minutes), 330 (every 120 minutes), 331 (every 60–120 minutes), 332 (every 60 minutes), 359 (every 30 minutes), 558 (every 60 minutes), 559 (every 60 minutes) and 647 (every 20/40 minutes), operated by BOGESTRA, Verkehrsgesellschaft Ennepe-Ruhr and WSW mobil.

References

S3 (Rhine-Ruhr S-Bahn)
Railway stations in North Rhine-Westphalia
Rhine-Ruhr S-Bahn stations
Ennepe-Ruhr-Kreis
Railway stations in Germany opened in 1987